Subjel (Serbian Cyrillic: Субјел) is a mountain in central Serbia, near the town of Kosjerić. Its highest peak Subjel has an elevation of 924 meters above sea level.

References

Mountains of Serbia